Mesra is a town and commune in Mostaganem Province, Algeria. It is the capital of  Mesra District. According to the 1998 census it has a population of 20,053.

References

Communes of Mostaganem Province